For a Woman's Honor is a lost 1919 silent film drama directed by Park Frame. It stars H. B. Warner, a stage actor. John Gilbert has a co-starring role in the feature.

Cast
H. B. Warner - Captain Clyde Mannering
Marguerite De La Motte - Helen Rutherford
John Gilbert - Dick Rutherford
Carmen Phillips - Valeska De Marsay
Hector V. Sarno - Rajput Nath (*Hector Sarno)
Olive Ann Alcorn
Roy Coulson
Carl Stockdale

References

External links
For A Woman's Honor at IMDb.com

1919 films
American silent feature films
Lost American films
Film Booking Offices of America films
1919 drama films
Silent American drama films
American black-and-white films
1919 lost films
Lost drama films
Films directed by Park Frame
1910s American films